Edmund Godwin Austen (15 November 1854 – 25 January 1932) was an English cricketer. He played in one first-class match in New Zealand for Canterbury in 1877/78. He was the brother of Henry Haversham Godwin-Austen.

See also
 List of Canterbury representative cricketers

References

External links
 

1854 births
1932 deaths
Canterbury cricketers
Cricketers from Surrey
English cricketers